Now Deh-e Gonabad (also Romanized as Now Deh-e Gonābād; also known as Now Deh and Naudeh) is a village in Howmeh Rural District, in the Central District of Gonabad County, Razavi Khorasan Province, Iran. At the 2006 census, its population was 198, in 58 families.

References 

Populated places in Gonabad County